William Arthur Gibbs (1865 – 4 May 1877) was the son of a glass-painter from Kingsland Road and a schoolboy at Christ's Hospital school in Sussex, England, who came to public attention after committing suicide by hanging on 4 May 1877 at age 12 out of fear of repeated punishments, including flogging, for having run away from the school to his family home. Gibbs had complained to his sister and his father that he was made a fag at school, that an older student had held his head underwater while he was bathing and that he would rather hang himself than be made a fag to that older student again. Both an older student and a teacher had admitted to corporally punishing Gibbs. This caused an outcry and the government subsequently held an official inquiry.

References

External links

1865 births
1877 deaths
1870s suicides
Bullying and suicide
Youth suicides
Christ's Hospital
Deaths by person in England
Suicides by hanging in England
Violence against men in the United Kingdom